The Special Investigative Service of Armenia (Armenian: Հայաստանի Հանրապետության հատուկ քննչական ծառայություն) is the main investigating authority in Armenia and operates as Armenia's anti-corruption agency answerable to the Prime Minister of Armenia. In its duties, it is considered to be an independent body "in its nature and also in its legislation". The current head is Sasun Khachatryan, who took office on 11 June 2018.

History 
The Special Investigation Service is relatively young agency in the system of law-enforcement agencies. It was established on 28 November  2007 by the adoption of the Law “On Special Investigation Service” that was ratified by President Robert Kocharyan on November 30 of the same year. It originally operated in the administrative building of Prosecutor General's Office, on a separate floor which ended up being insufficient for the activities of the Service. On 10 October 2014, President Serzh Sargsyan was present at the opening of the need building allocated for the Special Investigation Service.

Structure

Special Forces 

The Special Investigative Service of Armenia maintains a small tactical unit in order to not be dependent on other agencies. Very little is known about this special operations unit.

List of leaders 

 Vahram Shahinyan (-6 June 2018)
 Sasun Khachatryan (11 June 2018-present)

See also 

 Crime in Armenia
 National Security Service (Armenia)
 Police of Armenia
 Investigative Committee of Russia

References 

Law enforcement in Armenia
Government of Armenia